This article lists diplomatic missions accredited to the Sovereign Military Order of Malta. The Order does not have its own territory and its sovereign extraterritorial headquarters are located in Rome, therefore many countries accredit their Rome-based ambassadors to the Holy See additionally to the Order of Malta.

Accredited embassies

These embassies are also embassies to the Holy See (with embassy building located in Rome) unless otherwise noted:

 (Ambassador to the Holy See, additionally to the SMOM)

 (official relations only)

 (not accredited to the Holy See)
 (Rome, Head of delegation to UN)

 (Vatican City, Cardinal Patronus)

 (Warsaw, Ambassador to Poland)

 (Paris, Ambassador to France)
 (Valletta, Ambassador to SMOM with residence in the Maltese MFA)

 (Rome, Ambassador to Italy)

See also
 Foreign relations of the Sovereign Military Order of Malta
 List of diplomatic missions of the Sovereign Military Order of Malta

References

Sovereign Military Order of Malta
 
Order of Malta